"Winter World of Love" is a song recorded by Engelbert Humperdinck, which was released on his eponymous album and as a single in 1969.

The song was an international hit and spent 13 weeks on the UK Singles Chart, peaking at No. 7, while reaching No. 3 on the Irish Singles Chart, and No. 4 in Flanders. In Canada, the song reached No. 8 on the "RPM 100" and No. 1 on RPMs adult contemporary chart. In the United States, the song spent 12 weeks on the Billboard Hot 100 chart, peaking at No. 16, while reaching No. 3 on Billboards Easy Listening chart. The song was a hit in other nations as well.

Chart performance

References

1969 songs
1969 singles
Decca Records singles
Parrot Records singles
Engelbert Humperdinck songs
Songs written by Barry Mason
Songs written by Les Reed (songwriter)